West Is Best is a 1920 American short silent Western film directed by Phil Rosen and featuring Hoot Gibson.

Cast
 Hoot Gibson
 Josephine Hill
 William Lloyd
 Ah Wing
 H. H. Pattee credited as Herbert Pattee
 Harry Schumm
 C. E. Anderson

See also
 Hoot Gibson filmography

External links
 

1920 films
1920 Western (genre) films
1920 short films
American silent short films
American black-and-white films
Films directed by Phil Rosen
Silent American Western (genre) films
1920s American films